Macrocneme cyanea is a moth of the subfamily Arctiinae. It was described by Arthur Gardiner Butler in 1876. It is found in Rio de Janeiro, Brazil.

References

 Arctiidae genus list at Butterflies and Moths of the World of the Natural History Museum

Macrocneme
Moths described in 1876